4-Methyldiphenhydramine is an antihistamine and anticholinergic.

It is structurally analogous to diphenhydramine.

References 

H1 receptor antagonists
Diphenhydramines